U Camelopardalis is a semiregular variable star in the constellation Camelopardalis. Based on parallax measurements made by the Hipparcos spacecraft, it is located about 3,000 light-years (1,000 parsecs) away from the Earth. Its apparent visual magnitude is about 8, which is dim enough that it cannot be seen with the unaided eye.

The spectral type of U Camelopardalis in the revised MK system is C-N5, which indicates a classical carbon star spectrum approximately corresponding to late K or early M. The C2 index is 5.5 which is typical of a C-N star. It is also given an alternative spectral type of MS4, indicating a star similar to an M4 class but with somewhat enhanced ZrO bands. The spectral type may vary between C3,9 and C6,4e.

U Camelopardalis is a carbon star. These types of stars have greater levels of carbon in their atmospheres than oxygen, which means they form carbon compounds that make the star appear strikingly red. U Camelopardalis is nearly 4 magnitudes fainter at blue wavelengths than in the centre of the visual range. In the infrared K band it has an apparent magnitude of 0.37. Its brightness varies without a dominant period and it is classified as semi-regular, although a period of 400 days has been published. In the V photometric band the brightness varies by around half a magnitude, but the amplitude is nearly two magnitudes at blue wavelengths. The maximum visual magnitude has been given as 7.2.

The shell of gas surrounding U Camelopardalis was imaged by the Hubble Space Telescope in 2012, showing a nearly perfect sphere of gas surrounding the star.

U Cameloparadlis has a 10th magnitude companion 308" away. It is a B8 main sequence star, hotter but less luminous than U Cam itself. They are not thought to be physically associated.

References

Carbon stars
Camelopardalis (constellation)
Camelopardalis, U
022611
017257
Durchmusterung objects
Semiregular variable stars
Asymptotic-giant-branch stars